Walter Galloway Green (June 29, 1892 - June 26, 1962) was a Democratic member of the Mississippi House of Representatives, representing Adams County, from 1916 to 1920.

Biography 
Walter Galloway Green was born in Natchez, Mississippi, on June 29, 1892, to member of the Louisiana House of Representatives Thomas Keenan Green and Ellen Hay (Shotwell) Green. He was admitted to the bar in 1914. He was elected to the Mississippi House of Representatives, representing Adams County, in 1915. He died on June 26, 1962, in Gulfport, Mississippi.

References 

1892 births
1962 deaths
People from Natchez, Mississippi
Democratic Party members of the Mississippi House of Representatives